Alliance is an unincorporated community in Adams Township, Madison County, Indiana.

Alliance was a station and shipping point on the Big Four Railroad.

References

Unincorporated communities in Madison County, Indiana
Unincorporated communities in Indiana
Indianapolis metropolitan area